is a former Japanese football player.

Club statistics

References

External links

j-league

1991 births
Living people
Association football people from Shizuoka Prefecture
Japanese footballers
J1 League players
J2 League players
Shimizu S-Pulse players
Avispa Fukuoka players
Association football forwards